Allan Marshall (9 November 1851 – 31 March 1915) was a New Zealand  river captain and river engineer. Of Māori descent, he identified with the Ngati Pou and Waikato iwi. He was born in Mercer in the North Island and died at the age of 62.

References

1851 births
1915 deaths
New Zealand engineers
Ngāti Pou people
Waikato Tainui people
New Zealand sailors
19th-century New Zealand engineers